Facidia is a genus of moths of the family Erebidae. The genus was erected by Francis Walker in 1865.

Species
Facidia divisa Walker, 1865
Facidia laportei Berio, 1975
Facidia luteilinea Hampson, 1926 Nigeria
Facidia megastigma Herrich-Schäffer, 1854
Facidia pilosum Pagenstecher, 1888
Facidia remaudi Laporte, 1972
Facidia rivulosum Saalmüller, 1880
Facidia saalmuelleri Viette, 1965
Facidia stygium Saalmüller, 1881
Facidia vacillans (Walker, 1858) Gabon, Ghana, South Africa

References

Calpinae